Nena is the first album by German pop rock band Nena and the second studio album of its singer, Gabriele "Nena" Kerner. Released on 14 January 1983, it is part of the music genre called Neue Deutsche Welle (meaning "New German Wave") in German music.

The album was a great success in West Germany and the second single "99 Luftballons" successfully reached  in the music charts worldwide including Australia, Austria, Canada, Ireland, the Netherlands, New Zealand, Sweden, Switzerland and the United Kingdom. The single is considered a "one-hit wonder" by many in the US, despite the fact that other band's singles repeatedly topped European charts. It was produced by Manfred Praeker and Reinhold Heil of the German band Spliff.

The album has been initially released as a vinyl LP, cassette and CD.

The first single from the album, "Nur geträumt", was released a year earlier, in 1982. "99 Luftballons" was the second single, released in 1983.
The third and final single was "Leuchtturm", released in 1983, a few months after "99 Luftballons".

Prominent tracks

The three singles released from the Nena album have enjoyed particular prominence in Nena's career.  Although "99 Luftballons" is by far the most well known globally, the other two ("Nur geträumt" and "Leuchtturm") have for more than 30 years been ever-present features of the live concerts of firstly the band and then Nena in her subsequent solo career.

"Nur geträumt"

"Nur geträumt" was released in May 1982, eight months before the release of the album. Upon release, the single sold poorly. However, after Nena performed it on the TV programme Musikladen in August 1982, it catapulted the band to fame in Germany. Written by Nena and her boyfriend Rolf Brendel, the band's drummer, it is about a couple longing to spend time together.  It reached  in the German charts where it stayed for seven weeks from late October through early December 1982, being blocked from reaching  by  "Words".

If the track was the one which launched Nena's career in Germany, where its release preceded "99 Luftballons", it had the opposite effect in the Anglophone world where an English version ("Just a Dream") failed as a follow-up, only scraping into the low reaches of the UK charts.

In 2002, when Nena rekindled her solo career by releasing the triple platinum album Nena feat. Nena comprising re-worked versions of her 1980s greatest hits, "Nur geträumt" was among them. The album spawned three Top 10 hits in Germany but not the new version of "Nur geträumt", which only made . Given the huge success of the album, by 2010 Nena had reverted to performing the original versions of most of the album's songs, including "Nur geträumt".

"Leuchtturm"

"Leuchtturm" is a love song, its lyrics, written by Nena herself, describing how she and her "Kapitän" (captain) set off alone in a "U-Boot" (submarine) to see the world from a "Leuchtturm" (Lighthouse). They enjoy themselves so much that by the time the submarine surfaces, the lighthouse is no longer in view.  Released as the follow-up to "99 Luftballons", it reached  in the German charts in 1983.

In 2001, a reggae-style version of "Leuchtturm" for Nena's solo album Chokmah proved to be the precursor of the following year's Nena feat. Nena album, which was made up of updates of her 1980s greatest hits. Another version of "Leuchtturm" appeared on this 2002 album, this makeover both more fundamental and more enduring. The tempo of the song quickened and the lyrics were overhauled. With all mentions of captains and "U-Boots" removed, the song's message became a more generic affirmation of loyalty ("I'll go with you wherever you want... I won't ever leave you").  The drift from the song's original meaning is best illustrated by the fact that the song's title "Leuchtturm" doesn't even appear in the new lyrics and the revised theme of unquestioning devotion led to it being adopted as a football chant by fans of Borussia Dortmund.

Furthermore, despite the huge success of Nena feat. Nena, "Leuchtturm" is the only re-work from the album which Nena hasn't completely discarded in favour of the original version, instead during live concerts, the original version is first performed, then the 2002 version follows, which has been the case ever since.

In 2002 the single "Leuchtturm" was released with the additional title "Ich häng immer noch an dir" and with a remix by DJ Tomekk.

Track listing
Side A contains tracks 1 to 6 and Side B contains tracks 7 to 12.

Personnel
Credits adapted from Allmusic and Discogs.

Nena
Nena Kerner – lead vocals
Jörn-Uwe Fahrenkrog-Petersen – keyboards
Carlo Karges – guitars
Jürgen Dehmel – bass guitar
Rolf Brendel – drums

Technical personnel
Udo Arndt – mixer
Manfred "Manne" Praeker – production
Reinhold Heil – production
Imre Sereg – recorder
Jim Rakete – cover design

Charts

Weekly charts

Year-end charts

Certifications and sales

Release history

References

External links 
Nena at the official Nena website

1983 debut albums
Nena (band) albums
Albums produced by Reinhold Heil
CBS Records albums
Columbia Records albums
German-language albums